Hopewell is a village in KwaZulu-Natal, South Africa. It is situated 20 km south of Pietermaritzburg and 10 km east of Richmond.

References

Populated places in the Richmond Local Municipality